Deon Bird (born 27 January 1976) is an Australian former professional rugby league footballer who played in the 1990s and 2000s.

References

External links
Statistics at rugby.widnes.tv
 (archived by web.archive.org) Statistics at hullfc.com
Deon Bird Memory Box Search at archive.castigersheritage.com

1976 births
Living people
Adelaide Rams players
Australian expatriate rugby league players
Australian expatriate sportspeople in England
Australian expatriate sportspeople in France
Australian rugby league players
Castleford Tigers players
Expatriate rugby league players in England
Expatriate rugby league players in France
Gateshead Thunder (1999) players
Hull F.C. players
Paris Saint-Germain Rugby League players
Place of birth missing (living people)
Rugby league centres
Rugby league fullbacks
Wakefield Trinity players
Widnes Vikings players